The following is a list of notable deaths in April 1999.

Entries for each day are listed alphabetically by surname. A typical entry lists information in the following sequence:
 Name, age, country of citizenship at birth, subsequent country of citizenship (if applicable), reason for notability, cause of death (if known), and reference.

April 1999

1
Ellis Yarnal Berry, 96, American attorney, newspaper publisher and politician.
Gladys Hasty Carroll, 94, American novelist.
Bernie Deane, 81, Australian politician.
Stipe Delić, 73, Croatian film director.
Tony Frasca, 71, American ice hockey player and coach, stomach cancer.
Alfred Jahn, 83, Polish geographer, geomorphologist and polar explorer.
Tadahito Mochinaga, 80, Japanese stop-motion animator.
Madhurantakam Rajaram, 68, Indian author.
George Rapée, 83, American bridge player.
Wilson Riles, 81, American educator and politician.
Jesse Stone, 97, American R&B musician and songwriter.

2
Andrew Gardner, 66, British  newscaster, heart attack.
Julio Alberto Hernández, 98, Dominican composer and pianist.
Sophie Lihau-Kanza, 59, Congolese politician and sociologist, cardiac arrest.
Charlie Mitchell, 78, Amrican gridiron football player.
Josip Pokupec, 85, Yugoslav Olympic cyclist.

3
Lionel Bart, 68, British music writer, composer and lyricist (Oliver!, Living Doll), cancer.
John B. Daly, 69, American politician.
Herman Foster, 70, American bebop jazz pianist.
Traian Iordache, 87, Romanian football player and coach.
Evelyn Lambart, 84, Canadian animator and director.
Aldona Nenėnienė, 49, Soviet/Lithuanian handball and Olympic champion.
Geoffrey Walsh, 89, Canadian general.

4
Manuel Bernardo Aguirre, 90, Mexican politician.
Karl Barufka, 77, German footballer.
Faith Domergue, 74, American actress, cancer.
Jumabek Ibraimov, 55, Kyrgyz politician, stomach cancer.
Vane Ivanović, 85, Yugoslav-British athlete, political activist, diplomat and writer.
Lucille Lortel, 98, American actress, artistic director and theatrical producer.
Frank Charles McGee, 73, Canadian businessman and politician.
Vladimir Orlov, 77, Soviet politician.
Bob Peck, 53, British actor (Jurassic Park, Edge of Darkness, Lord of the Flies), cancer.
Eric Ramsay, 82, Australian politician.
Ambroise Roux, 77, French businessman and political advisor, heart attack.
Early Wynn, 79, American baseball player (Cleveland Indians) and member of the MLB Hall of Fame.

5
Paul David, 79, Canadian cardiologist and politician.
Oleksiy Demyanyuk, 40, Soviet high jumper and Olympian.
Giulio Einaudi, 87, Italian book publisher.
Chester E. McCarty, 93, American officer and pilot in the US Air Force.
John Wiles, 73, South African novelist, television writer and producer (Doctor Who).

6
Hienadz Karpienka, 49, Belarusian scientist and politician opposing president Alexander Lukashenko, stroke.
Robert D. Lindsay, 79, Canadian politician.
Red Norvo, 91, American jazz musician known as "Mr. Swing".
William Pleeth, 83, British cellist.
Angus Ellis Taylor, 87, American mathematician and academic.

7
Ivan Diviš, 74, Czech poet and essayist, fall.
Heinz Lehmann, 87, German-born Canadian psychiatrist known as the "father of modern psychopharmacology".
Angus Paton, 93, British civil engineer.
Bob Tough, 78, American basketball player.

8
Pipaluk Freuchen, 81, Danish-Greenlandic-Swedish writer.
Vic Fisher, 74, Australian rules footballer.
Luis Castro Leiva, 56, Venezuelan academic, writer and columnist, brain haemorrhage.
Fritz Tegtmeier, 81, German Luftwaffe flying ace during World War II.

9
George Sidney Bishop, 85, British civil servant and businessman.
Clay Bryant, 87, American Major League Baseball player.
Bert Firman, 93, English bandleader.
Raúl Silva Henríquez, 91, Chilean prelate of the Catholic Church.
Jerold Hoffberger, 80, American businessman.
Marcel Lihau, 67, Congolese politician, jurist, and law professor.
Mary Lutyens, 90, British author.
Ibrahim Baré Maïnassara, 49, Niger military officer, murdered.
Albert Popwell, 72, American actor (Dirty Harry, Cleopatra Jones, Search), complications following open heart surgery.

10
John Ngu Foncha, 82, Cameroonian politician.
Heinz Fraenkel-Conrat, 88, Polish-American biochemist, lung failure.
Charles Green, 85, South African-British RAF fighter pilot during World War II and Olympic medalist in bobsledding.
Brownie Mary, 76, American medical cannabis rights activist, heart attack.
James D. McCawley, 61, Scottish-American linguist.
Tu'i Pelehake, 77, Tonga royal and politician, Prime Minister.
Thakazhi Sivasankara Pillai, 86, Indian novelist and short story writer.
Jean Vander Pyl, 79, American actress and voice actress, lung cancer.
Ali Sayad Shirazi, 54, Iranian army officer, assassinated, homicide.
Thornton Wilson, 78, American chairman and CEO of Boeing corporation.

11
William H. Armstrong, 87, American children's writer.
Tom Bane, 85, American politician.
Pete Milne, 74, American baseball player.
Agim Ramadani, 35, Kosovar Albanian commander of the Kosovo Liberation Army, killed in action.
Slavko Ćuruvija, 49, Serbian journalist and newspaper publisher, murdered.

12
Ricardo Barreiro, 49, Argentine comic book writer, esophageal cancer.
José Francisco de Morais, 49, Brazilian football player.
Alan Evans, 49, Welsh darts player.
Hugo Fernando, 86, Sri Lankan actor and composer.
Carlos Jaschek, 73, German-Argentine astrophysicist.
Marion Albert Pruett, 49, American spree killer, execution by lethal injection.
Boxcar Willie, 67, American country music singer-songwriter, leukemia.

13
Edith Anderson, 83, American journalist, writer and translator.
James M. Clarke, 81, American farmer and politician.
Knut Hauge, 87, Norwegian writer.
Masaji Kiyokawa, 86, Japanese sports administrator and Olympic medalist, pancreatic cancer.
Don McGuire, 80, American actor, director, screenwriter, and producer.
Walter H. Moeller, 89, American politician.
Sheik Chinna Moulana, 74, Indian nadhaswaram player.
Ortvin Sarapu, 75, Estonian-New Zealand chess player.
Willi Stoph, 84, East German politician.
Visakha Wijeyeratne, 64, Sri Lankan painter, sculptor, writer and social worker.

14
Ellen Corby, 87, American actress (The Waltons, Vertigo, Shane), Emmy winner (1973), stroke.
Anthony Newley, 67, British singer-songwriter and actor, kidney cancer.
Robert G. Sachs, 82, American theoretical physicist.
Aubrey Schenck, 90, American film producer.
Brigitte Steden, 50, German badminton player and Olympian.
Werner Stumm, 74, Swiss chemist.
Nicola Trussardi, 56, Italian fashion designer, car accident.
Bill Wendell, 75, American television announcer, complications from cancer.

15
Hermann Biechele, 81, German politician and member of the Bundestag.
Roy Chiao, 72, British Hong Kong-era Chinese actor, heart failure.
Aaron Esterson, 75, British psychiatrist.
K. R. Srinivasa Iyengar, 90, Indian writer in English.
F. Burton Jones, 88, American mathematician.
Harvey Postlethwaite, 55, British Formula One team technical director, heart attack.

16
Kaoru Betto, 78, Japanese baseball player.
Regis Cordic, 72, American radio personality and actor.
Vincent J. Dellay, 91, American politician.
Osmund Faremo, 77, Norwegian politician.
Rudi Fehr, 87, German-born American film editor (Dial M for Murder, Prizzi's Honor, Key Largo), heart attack.
Zoë Lund, 37, American musician, model, actress, producer and screenwriter, cocaine-induced heart failure.
Charles McKimson, 84, American animator.
Abbott Lawrence Pattison, 82, American sculptor and abstract artist.
Karl Schefold, 94, Swiss archaeologist.
Skip Spence, 52, American singer-songwriter (Jefferson Airplane, Moby Grape), lung cancer.
Margaret Tait, 80, Scottish film maker and poet.
Gordon Watson, 78, Australian classical pianist.

17
Julian Cole, 74, American mathematician.
Ahmad Mohamed Ibrahim, 82, Singaporean lawyer and law professor.
Georges Miez, 94, Swiss gymnast, cerebrovascular disease.
Richard Negri, 71, British theatre director and designer.
Nicky Virachkul, 50, American darts player, cancer.

18
Alan Brazier, 74, English cricket player.
Vicente Escrivá, 85, Spanish film director, producer and screenwriter.
Ye Fei, 84, Filipino-Chinese general and politician.
Enrique Hormazábal, 68, Chilean football player.
Robert Irving, 51, English rugby player, heart attack.
Gert Jeschonnek, 86, German naval officer.
Setsuko Migishi, 94, Japanese Yōga painter.
Herman Miller, 79, American film writer and producer.
Gian-Carlo Rota, 66, Italian-American mathematician and philosopher.
Raghubir Singh, 56, Indian photographer, heart attack.

19
Stanley T. Adams, 76, United States Army officer, Alzheimer's disease.
Hermine Braunsteiner, 79, German Nazi concentration camp guard.
Margaret Campbell, 86, Politician in Ontario, Canada.
Flora Carabella, 73, Italian actress, bone cancer.
Shay Gorman, 76, Irish actor.
Helen Lundeberg, 90, American painter, pneumonia.
Arthur Morton, 84, American football player and coach.
Yoko Tani, 70, Japanese actress and nightclub entertainer, cancer.

20
Flash Hollett, 88, Canadian ice hockey player.
James Cullen Martin, 71, American chemist.
Reginald O'Brien, 73, Australian politician.
Nikos Rizos, 74, Greek actor, edema, heart attack.
Bethsabée de Rothschild, 84, French philanthropist and member of the Rothschild family.
Rick Rude, 40, professional wrestler, heart failure following accidental overdose.
Señor Wences, 103, Spanish ventriloquist.
Charles E. Whittingham, 86, American racehorse trainer.
Students killed in the Columbine High School massacre:
Cassie Bernall, 17, victim.
Eric Harris, 18, perpetrator.
Dylan Klebold, 17, perpetrator.
Rachel Scott, 17, victim.

21
Tim Forster, 65, British racehorse trainer.
Phillip Omondi, 42, Ugandan football player and manager.
Ralph Perk, 85, American politician.
Charles Rogers, 94, American actor and jazz musician.
Mandayani Jeersannidhi Thirumalachar, 84, Indian mycologist, microbiologist and plant pathologist.
Liz Tilberis, 51, British fashion magazine editor, ovarian cancer.
Su Xuelin, 102, Chinese author and scholar.

22
Ida Anak Agung Gde Agung, 77, Indonesian politician.
Bill Bowen, 70, American politician.
Joseph W.S. deGraft-Johnson, 65, Ghanaian engineer, academic and politician.
Munir Ahmad Khan, 72, Pakistani nuclear engineer and physicist, complications following heart surgery.
Jean-Claude Molinari, 67, French tennis player.
Apostolos Nikolaidis, 60, Greek singer, cancer.
Bert Remsen, 74, American actor.
Z. A. Suleri, Pakistani political journalist, author and activist, heart failure.
Anne Szumigalski, 77, Canadian poet.

23
Maria Àngels Anglada, 69, Catalan poet and novelist.
Dana Childs, 76, American politician, lawyer and jurist, heart attack.
Melba Liston, 73, American jazz trombonist, arranger and composer.
Aleksandr Prokofyevich Markevich, 94, Ukrainian zoologist, helminthologist and copepodologist.
Tullio Pandolfini, 84, Italian water polo player and Olympic champion.
Francis J. Pettijohn, 94, American geologist.
M. V. Rajamma, 78, Indian actress, singer and movie producer.
Roger Rio, 86, French football player.
Philip Stratford, 71, Canadian translator, professor and poet.
Celso Torrelio, 65, Bolivian military general and member of the Junta.

24
Nanabhai Bhatt, 83, Indian Bollywood film director and producer, heart failure.
Arthur Boyd, 78, Australian painter.
Ray Evans, 76, American football player.
Don Nolander, 77, American gridiron football player.
Charles Rostaing, 94, French linguist.
Don Schofield, Australian rugby player.

25
Roman Hruska, 94, American politician, complications following a broken hip.
Rupert Lonsdale, 93, British submarine commander and prisoner of war during World War II.
Michael Morris, 3rd Baron Killanin, 84, Irish journalist, author and Olympic official.
William McCrea, 94, English astronomer and mathematician.
Martti Simojoki, 90, Finnish archbishop .
Roger Troutman, 47, American musician, producer and founder of Zapp and Roger, fratricide, fusillade.
Michi Weglyn, 72, American author.

26
Man Mohan Adhikari, 78, 31st Prime Minister of Nepal.
Adrian Borland, 41, British musician, producer and frontman of The Sound, suicide.
Jill Dando, 37, British journalist and television presenter (Crimewatch), murder by gunshot.
Trilicia Gunawardena, 65,  Sri Lankan actress and singer.
Faye Throneberry, 67, American baseball player.

27
Arbit Blatas, 90, Lithuanian artist and sculptor.
Dominick L. DiCarlo, 71, American lawyer and politician, heart attack.
Al Hirt, 76, American trumpeter and bandleader, liver failure.
Peter Jackson, 87, British cricket player.
Pavel Klushantsev, 89, Russian cameraman, film director, producer, screenwriter and author.
Rolf Landauer, 72, German-born American physicist, brain cancer.
He Luting, 95, Chinese composer.
Antonio Merayo, 89, Argentine cinematographer.
Maria Stader, 87, Hungarian-Swiss lyric soprano.
Cyril Washbrook, 84, English cricketer.
Mark Weiser, 46, American computer scientist, liver failure.

28
Brandon Burlsworth, 22, American football player, car accident.
Rory Calhoun, 76, American film and television actor, screenwriter and producer, diabetes.
Jean-Blaise Kololo, 47, Congolese politician and diplomat.
Osvaldo Civile, 40, Argentine heavy metal guitarist (V8, Horcas).
Alf Ramsey, 79, British football player and manager (Ipswich Town, England), Alzheimer's disease and prostate cancer.
Arthur Leonard Schawlow, 77, American physicist and co-inventor of the laser with Charles Townes, leukemia.
John Stears, 64, British special effects artist (Star Wars, Thunderball, The Mask of Zorro), Oscar winner (1966, 1978), stroke.
Donald E. Stewart, 69, American screenwriter, cancer.
Roderick Thorp, 62, American novelist, heart attack.
Arvo Viitanen, 75, Finnish cross-country skier and Olympic medalist.
Harold Wellman, 90, English-New Zealand geologist.

29
Léon Barzin, 98, Belgian-American conductor.
Les Bennett, 81, English football player.
Barbara Bevege, 56, New Zealand cricket player.
Faustin Birindwa, Prime Minister of Zaire (1993 – 1994), heart attack.
Bernhard Cuiper, 85, German basketball player.
Mohan Gokhale, 45, Indian actor, heart attack.
Lojze Kozar, 88, Slovene Roman Catholic priest, writer, and translator.
Oscar Ljung, 89, Swedish film actor.
Elspeth March, 88, English actress.
Ovídio Martins, 70, Cape Verdean poet and journalist.
Zabihollah Safa, 87, Iranian scholar.
Kidar Sharma, 89, Indian film director, producer and screenwriter.
Yao Xueyin, 88, Chinese novelist.

30
Bruce Jesson, New Zealand journalist, author and political figure, cancer.
Jessica Lal, 34, Indian model, murdered.
Rikuo Nemoto, 72, Japanese baseball catcher and manager in the Nippon Professional Baseball.
Jack Schiff, American comic book writer and editor.
Darrell Sweet, 51, English drummer and member of Nazareth, heart attack.

References 

1999-04
 04